Eric Chapman Rodin (February 5, 1930 – January 4, 1991) was an American professional baseball player. An outfielder, he had a nine-season (1950–1951; 1954–1960) career in minor league baseball, and a five-game major league trial at the close of the  season with the eventual world champion New York Giants. Born in Orange, New Jersey, Rodin attended The Lawrenceville School and the University of Pennsylvania.

Rodin was recalled by the Giants after batting .336 with 18 home runs for the 1954 Nashville Vols of the Double-A Southern Association. He appeared as a pinch hitter and late-inning defensive replacement as a rightfielder and centerfielder for the Giants in five games played, collecting no hits in six at bats with no bases on balls. He struck out twice, including in his first major league at bat against Curt Simmons of the Philadelphia Phillies on September 7.

During his nine-year, 953-game minor league career, Rodin batted .300 with 117 home runs. He retired after the 1960 season.

References

External links
, or Retrosheet, or Pura Pelota

1930 births
1991 deaths
Baseball players from New Jersey
Columbus Jets players
Corpus Christi Giants players
Knoxville Smokies players
Little Rock Travelers players
Major League Baseball outfielders
Minneapolis Millers (baseball) players
Montgomery Rebels players
Nashville Vols players
Navegantes del Magallanes players
American expatriate baseball players in Venezuela
New York Giants (NL) players
Oakland Oaks (baseball) players
Seattle Rainiers players
Sportspeople from Essex County, New Jersey
Sunbury Giants players
Tampa Tarpons (1957–1987) players
Toronto Maple Leafs (International League) players
Trenton Giants players